Bisulfide (or bisulphide in British English) is an inorganic anion with the chemical formula HS− (also written as SH−). It contributes no color to bisulfide salts, and its salts may have a distinctive putrid smell. It is a strong base. Bisulfide solutions are corrosive and attack the skin.

It is an important chemical reagent and an industrial chemical, mainly used in paper pulp industry (Kraft process), textiles, synthetic flavors, coloring brasses, and iron control.

Properties 

A variety of salts are known, including sodium hydrosulfide and potassium hydrosulfide. Ammonium hydrosulfide, a component of "stink bombs" has not been isolated as a pure solid. Some compounds described as salts of the sulfide dianion contain primarily hydrosulfide.

Aqueous bisulfide absorbs light at around 230 nm in the UV–visible spectrum. Using this approach, bisulfide has been detected in the ocean and in sewage.
Bisulfide should not be confused with the disulfide dianion, or −S–S−.

Basicity 

The bisulfide anion can accept a proton:

Because of its affinity to accept a proton (H+), bisulfide has a basic character. In aqueous solution, it has a corresponding pKa value of 6.9. Its conjugate acid is hydrogen sulfide. However, bisulfide's basicity stems from its behavior as an Arrhenius base. A solution containing spectator-only counter ions, has a basic pH according to the following acid-base reaction:

Chemical reactions 

Upon treatment with an acid, bisulfide converts to hydrogen sulfide. With strong acids, it can be doubly protonated to give . Oxidation of bisulfide gives sulfate. When strongly heated, bisulfide salts decompose to produce sulfide salts and hydrogen sulfide.

Biochemistry 

At physiological pH, hydrogen sulfide is usually fully ionized to bisulfide (HS−).  Therefore, in biochemical settings, "hydrogen sulfide" is often used to mean, bisulfide. Hydrosulfide has been identified as the third gasotransmitter along with nitric oxide and carbon monoxide.

Other derivatives 

SH− is a soft anionic ligand that forms complexes with most metal ions. Examples include [Au(SH)2]− and (C5H5)2Ti(SH)2, derived from gold(I) chloride and titanocene dichloride, respectively.

Safety 

Bisulfide salts are corrosive, strongly alkaline and release toxic hydrogen sulfide upon acidification.

See also 

 Disulfide
 Sulfide
 Sulfanyl
 Thiol, SH bonded to an organic group

References 

Anions
Sulfur ions
Acid–base chemistry

hu:Hidrogénszulfid